= Santa María la Real y Antigua de Gamonal =

Church in Burgos, Spain

Coordinates: 42°21′14″N 3°39′57″W

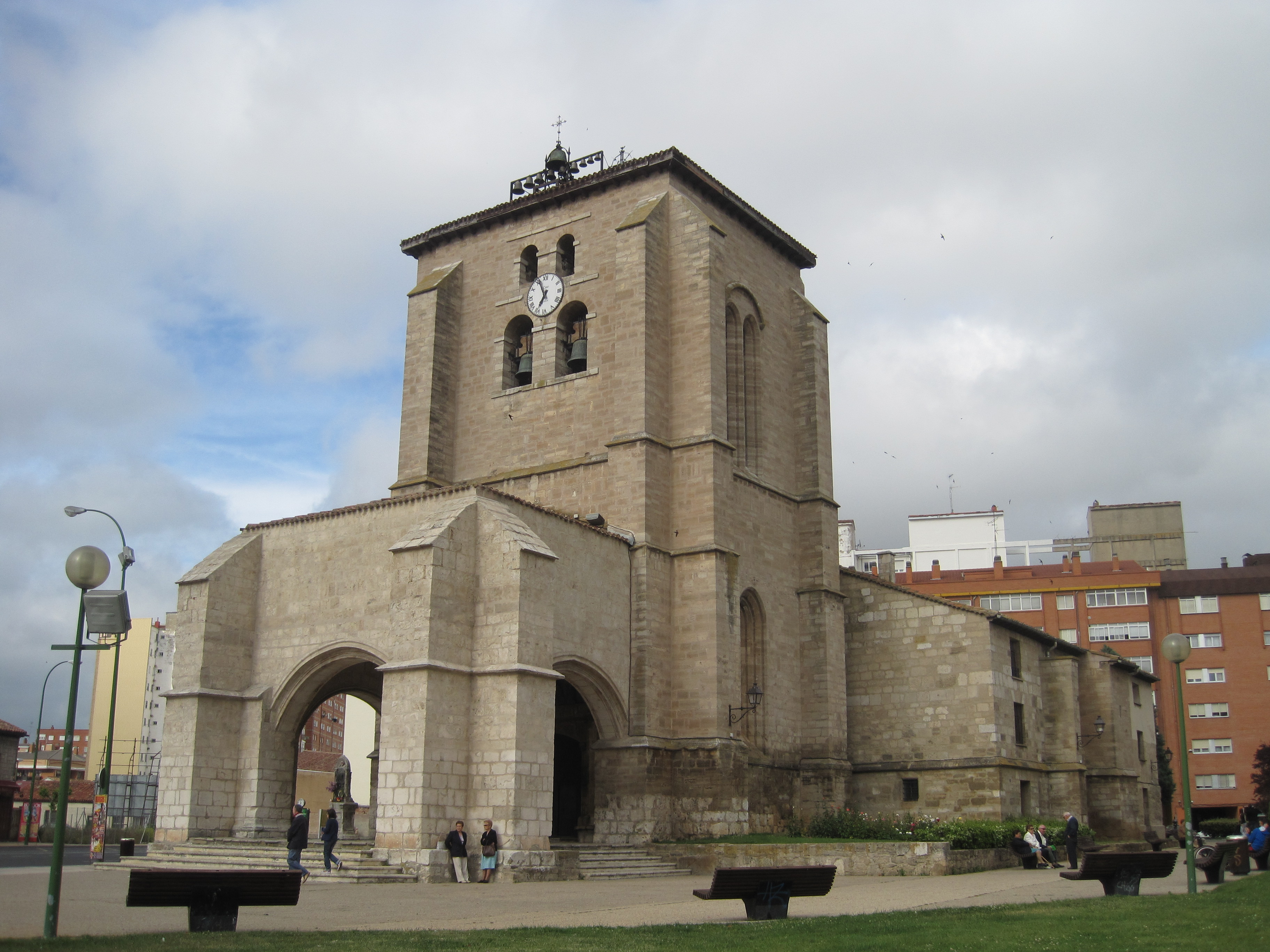
Iglesia de Santa María la Real y Antigua de Gamonal

Iglesia de Santa María la Real y Antigua de Gamonal is a church in Burgos, Spain. The Gothic structure dates to the 14th century, although there is evidence of an earlier church dating back to the eleventh century, when King Alfonso VI moved his seat from the destroyed city of Oca of the Auca diocese in 1075. It became a Bien de Interés Cultural listed building on 3 June 1931.
